Marcel Jenni (born 2 March 1974 in Zürich, Switzerland) is a Swiss professional ice hockey winger who is currently a free agent. He has played with Swedish Elitserien club Färjestads BK between 1999 and 2005 and with the Kloten Flyers from 2005 to 2015. He represented Switzerland in the Winter Olympics in both 2002 and 2006.

Career statistics

Regular season and playoffs

International

References

External links

1974 births
Living people
Färjestad BK players
HC Lugano players
Ice hockey players at the 2002 Winter Olympics
Ice hockey players at the 2006 Winter Olympics
EHC Kloten players
Olympic ice hockey players of Switzerland
Swiss ice hockey left wingers
Ice hockey people from Zürich